The 1988–89 Scottish League Cup was the forty-third season of Scotland's second football knockout competition. The competition was won by Rangers, who defeated Aberdeen in the Final.

First round

Second round

Third round

Quarter-finals

Semi-finals

Final

References

General

Specific

League Cup
1988-89